"Anything Goes" is a song co-written and recorded by American country music artist Gary Morris.  It released in May 1986 as the fourth single and title track from the album Anything Goes.  The song reached #28 on the Billboard Hot Country Singles & Tracks chart.  The song was written by Morris and Eddie Setser.

Chart performance

References

1986 singles
1985 songs
Gary Morris songs
Songs written by Gary Morris
Songs written by Eddie Setser
Song recordings produced by Jim Ed Norman
Warner Records singles